Dihydroergocornine is an ergot alkaloid. Alongside dihydroergocristine and dihydroergocryptine, it is one of the three components of ergoloid.

References

Ergot alkaloids
Lysergamides
Oxazolopyrrolopyrazines
Lactams